Khan Kluay (Thai: ก้านกล้วย) is a 2006 Thai computer-animated adventure film set in Ayutthaya-era Siam about a Thai elephant who wanders away from his mother and becomes the war elephant for King Naresuan. It is based on the story Chao Phraya Prap Hongsawadee  by Ariya Jintapanichkarn. The film took three years to make, and was released on May 18, 2006 in Thailand. In 2008, the film was released as The Blue Elephant in the United States on September 2, and as Jumbo in India in December 25.

Khan Kluay is directed by Kompin Kemgumnird, an animator who had worked on Disney films such as Snow White and the Seven Dwarfs, Dumbo, The Lion King, Atlantis: The Lost Empire and Tarzan and Blue Sky Studios' Ice Age. Produced by Kantana Animation, it was the first Thai 3D animated feature film and the first Thai animated feature film released since The Adventure of Sudsakorn, a 1979 cel-animated film by Payut Ngaokrachang. The film's sequel, Khan Kluay 2, is about Khan Kluay's two elephant children, another attack by the Hanthawaddy, and the choice between living with his wife or fighting the Burmese. An animated television series, The Adventures of Khan Kluay, was produced by Kantana Animation Studio and broadcast on BBTV Channel 7.

Plot

Characters
Khan Kluay: The title character, was born in the wild. His mission is to find his father name is "Phupa", who is evidently dead and cremated.
King Naresuan the Great (Black Prince): King of the Ayuttahaya Kingdom, is the first human Khan Kluay befriends.
Chabakaew: Is a pink elephant with a flower on her left ear. She is Khan Kluay's wife
Nguangdeang: The evil Burma Elephant. He is the royal elephant of Hanthawaddy.

Voice cast
 Anyarit Pitakkul as Khan Kluay (young)
 Nawarat Techarathanaprasert as Chaba Kaew (child)
 Phoori Hiranyapruk as older Khan Kluay
 Warattaya Nilkuha (Jui) as older Chaba Kaew
 Pongsak Hiranyapruk as Jitrit, a pigeon
 Nanthana Bunlong as Saeng-daa
 Suthep Po-ngam as Mahout
 Channarong Khuntee-tao as Burmese general
 Klos Utthaseri as Mingyi Swa
 Juree Ohsiri
 Koti Aramboy

US English dub
 Thomas Starkley as Khan Kluay (young)
 Jeremy Redleaf as Khan Kluay (old)
 Miranda Cosgrove as Kon Suay 
 Martin Short as Jai
 Amy Carlson as Nuan, Cha, Cow
 Carl Reiner as Tian
 Kate Simses as Sang Da
 Troy Baker as Marong, Young Prince Naresuan, Minchit Sra
 Richard Epcar as King Narusean, Ajan, Officer
 Cindy Robinson as Matriarch Elephant, Dela

Hindi voice actors
 Akshay Kumar as Jayveer "Jumbo" the elephant/Himself (narrator)
 Ashar Shaikh as Baby Jayveer "Jumbo"
 Lara Dutta as Sonia
 Vaishnavi Shetty as Baby Sonia
 Rajpal Yadav as Dildar Yadav
 Dimple Kapadia as Devi
 Amar Babaria as Rajkumar Vikramaditya
 Asrani as Senapati
 Gulshan Grover as Bakhtavar

Production

Khan Kluay was directed by Kompin Kemgumnird, an animator who had worked on the Disney films The Lion King, Atlantis: The Lost Empire and Tarzan, and Blue Sky Studios' Ice Age. Produced by Kantana Animation, it was the first Thai 3-D animated feature film and the first animated Thai feature since Payut Ngaokrachang's cel-animated The Adventure of Sudsakorn (1979). Khan Kluay took three years to produce.

Releases
Khan Kluay was released in Thailand on May 18, 2006, and the film was shown to an audience of Asian elephants and their mahouts in an outdoor screening in Ayutthaya Province on June 6 of that year. It was released in September 2008 on DVD in the United States as The Blue Elephant. The Indian production Percept Picture Company bought the rights to the film and released a Hindi-language version, Jumbo, on December 25, 2008; Indian actor Akshay Kumar voiced the main character, Jumbo.

United States
The film was released in the US on September 2, 2008, by the Jim Henson Company and the Weinstein Company as The Blue Elephant. Like other foreign animated films which have been dubbed into English (such as My Neighbor Totoro and Kiki's Delivery Service), it was released direct-to-video. The film was re-dubbed with celebrity voices, including Martin Short, Miranda Cosgrove and Carl Reiner. Some scenes were deleted for the US version, and character names were changed.

India
The film released in India on December 25, 2008 as Jumbo by the Percept Picture Company. It was re-dubbed with a cast which included Akshay Kumar and Rajpal Yadav.

Festivals and awards
 2006 Thailand National Film Association Awards
Best picture
Best script
Best score
Best sound recording
 2006 Golden Doll Awards
 Best score
 Best sound recording
 2006 Bangkok Critics Assembly
 Best score
 2006 Starpics Awards
 Best score
 2006 Star Entertainment Awards
 Best picture
 Best score
 2006 Animadrid, International Animation Festival, Spain
 Best Feature Film
 2007 Sprockets Toronto International Film Festival for Children
 2007 Golden Elephant International Children's Film Festival
 Opening film

Sequal and spin-off
A 2009 film sequel, Khan Kluay 2, was a box-office bomb.

An animated television series, The Adventures of Khan Kluay, was produced by Kantana Animation Studio and is broadcast on BBTV Channel 7 in Thailand.

Khan Kluay featured in animations broadcast in 2016 as the lead-in to Thailand Move Forward, a government-information program which all television stations in Thailand are required to broadcast at 6 pm.

References

External links
 
 Review at ThaiCinema.org

2006 films
2006 computer-animated films
2000s children's animated films
Thai animated films
Thai children's films
Animated films about elephants
Thai-language films
Fictional elephants
Best Picture Suphannahong National Film Award winners
Thai national heritage films
Sahamongkol Film International films